Antona abscissa is a moth of the subfamily Arctiinae first described by Jacob Hübner in 1827. It is found in the Amazon basin.

References

Lithosiini
Moths described in 1827
Moths of South America